is a passenger railway station located in Ōmiya-ku, Saitama, Saitama Prefecture, Japan, operated by East Japan Railway Company (JR East).

Lines

Station layout
This station has and elevated station building with two ground-level island platforms serving four tracks. The station has a Midori no Madoguchi ticket office.

Platforms

Platform edge doors are scheduled to be installed on the Keihin-Tohoku Line platforms (1 and 2) in 2017, being brought into service on 23 September 2017.

History
The station opened on 1 April 2000.

Passenger statistics
In fiscal 2019, the JR station was used by an average of 55,782 passengers daily (boarding passengers only). The passenger figures for previous years are as shown below.

Surrounding area
 Saitama New Urban Center
 Saitama Super Arena
 Cocoon City shopping centre

Bus services
There is a direct express bus service to and from Narita Airport.

See also
 List of railway stations in Japan

References

External links

  

Keihin-Tōhoku Line
Railway stations in Saitama (city)
Tōhoku Main Line
Utsunomiya Line
Railway stations in Japan opened in 2000